Rick Rock Presents Federation: The Album is the debut studio album by American hip hop group The Federation. It was released on October 5, 2004 via Virgin Records, and was entirely produced by Rick Rock. It also features guest appearances from Daz Dillinger, E-40, and Twista among others. Despite being released for a major label, The album was poorly promoted and was a commercial failure, just managing to reach the bottom of the US Billboard 200 at number 200. The album's two singles, "Hyphy" and "Go Dumb", also failed to find much success, only reaching 88 and 95 respectively on the Billboard Hot R&B/Hip-Hop Songs chart.

The song “Mayhem” was featured on American football video game Madden NFL 2004.

Track listing

Personnel

 Anthony "Goldie" Caldwell – main performer
 Marvin "Doonie Baby" Selmon – main performer
 Thomas "Stressmatic" Jackson – main performer
 Gary "Eldorado Red" Bradford – guest performer (track 2)
 Earl "E-40" Stevens – guest performer (track 3)
 Battle Locco – guest performer (track 7)
 Kinsmoke – guest performer (track 7)
 Delmar "Daz" Arnaud – guest performer (track 10)
 Next Level – guest performer (track 11)
 J. "Undaflow" East – guest performer (tracks: 12, 14)
 Carl "Twista" Mitchell – guest performer (track 14)
 Michael Denten – backing vocals (track 14), mixing (tracks: 8, 11), recording (tracks: 11, 12, 18)
 Femi Ojetunde – guitar (track 11)
 Ricardo "Rick Rock" Thomas – producer, executive producer, mixing (tracks: 5, 11, 12, 14, 16, 18), recording (track 18)
 "Big Jon" Platt – executive producer
 Richard "Segal" Huredia – mixing (tracks: 1-3, 5, 7, 12-14, 16, 18)
 Ken "Duro" Ifill – mixing (track 4)
 Kevin "KD" Davis – mixing (tracks: 6, 9, 10)
 Dustin "Nump" Perfetto – recording (tracks: 1, 7, 8, 12)
 Joe Jackson – recording (tracks: 2-7, 9-14, 16, 18), A&R
 Chris Young – engineering (tracks: 1-3, 5, 7, 11-13, 16, 18)
 Jason Stasium – engineering (track 4)
 Josh McDonnel – engineering (track 4)
 Richard Balmer – engineering (tracks: 5, 11, 12, 16, 18)
 Sean Tallman – engineering (tracks: 6, 9, 10)
 Chris Bellman – mastering
 Liza Lowinger – art direction
 Brian – art direction & design
 Jonathan Mannion – photography
 Julie Dickens – A&R
 Michelle Ryang – A&R
 Ronette Bowie – A&R
 Scott Gordon – A&R
 Wendi Cothran – A&R
 Sean Mosher-Smith – creative director

Chart positions
Album

References

External links

2004 debut albums
Albums produced by Rick Rock
Virgin Records albums